Rajanya Mitra is a Bengali actress who works primarily in TV soap operas.

Career
Rajanya started her acting through the documentary movie, A Journey from Calcutta to Kolkata (2009), directed by Debasis Choudhuri. Thereafter, she continued playing prominent and supporting roles in Bengali soap opera produced by Saibal Banerjee and Leena Gangopadhyay. In 2012, she also played the role of Esha in Checkmate. Some of her well known works includes Mahua Bose in Nokshi Kantha and Mishti in Khorkuto.

Filmography

Television

Films
A Journey from Calcutta to Kolkata (2009)
Chhata (2018)

References

External links
 

Living people
Bengali television actresses
21st-century Indian actresses
Year of birth missing (living people)